The Island day gecko (Phelsuma nigristriata) is a species of gecko.

Distribution
Phelsuma nigristriata is endemic to Mayotte.

Description

It is a diurnal and arboreal gecko that has an elongated appearance. The top is green from the tail to the head. The underside is white. On its mid side, a black line goes up to eye level.

Etymology
The name of this species (nigristriata) means black stripes.

References
 Meier, 1984 : Zwei neue Formen der Gattung Phelsuma von den Komoren (Sauria: Gekkonidae). Salamandra, n. 1, .

Phelsuma
Reptiles described in 1984